The Fall River Railroad was incorporated in 1846 as a merger between the Fall River Branch Railroad, the Middleborough Railroad Corporation and the Randolph & Bridgewater Railroad Corporation. The railroad ran from Fall River through Middleborough and Bridgewater to South Braintree where it connected to the Old Colony Railroad line. 

The Fall River Railroad provided a direct rail link with access to the sea between the emerging textile town of Fall River and Boston. It operated until 1854 when it merged into the Old Colony Railroad to become the Old Colony and Fall River Railroad Company.

In 1847, under the leadership of Richard Borden the Fall River Railroad began regular steamship service to New York City. The service became known as the Fall River Line, which for many years was the preferred means of travel between Boston and New York City.

The MBTA currently operates the Middleborough/Lakeville Line commuter rail line service to Boston along the 1846 alignment of the Fall River Railroad. The original 1845 alignment of the Fall River Branch Railroad is currently part of the planned South Coast Rail commuter rail link from Fall River to Boston.

See also
Old Colony & Fall River Railroad Museum
Taunton Branch Railroad

References

Predecessors of the New York, New Haven and Hartford Railroad
Railway companies established in 1846
Railway companies disestablished in 1854
Defunct Massachusetts railroads
Old Colony Railroad lines
1846 establishments in Massachusetts
American companies established in 1846
American companies disestablished in 1854